Edward Bernard Roetz (August 6, 1905 – March 16, 1965) was a professional baseball player.  He was an infielder during one season (1929) with the St. Louis Browns.  For his career, he compiled a .244 batting average in 45 at-bats and drove in five runs.  Roetz also played 11 seasons in the minor leagues, hitting .296 with 116 home runs.

He was born and later died in Philadelphia at the age of 59.

External links

1905 births
1965 deaths
St. Louis Browns players
Major League Baseball shortstops
Baseball players from Pennsylvania
Minor league baseball managers
Wichita Falls Spudders players
Topeka Senators players
Hanover Raiders players
Richmond Byrds players
Albany Senators players
Johnstown Johnnies players
Wilkes-Barre Barons (baseball) players
Baltimore Orioles (IL) players
Anniston Rams players